Sidis may refer to:

Boris Sidis (1867–1923), psychologist, psychiatrist, and psychopathologist, father of William James
William James Sidis (1898–1944), eccentric genius and child prodigy, son of Boris
 Sidis (genus), a genus of lady beetles, in the family Coccinellidae
 The Sidi or Siddi, an Indian and Pakistani ethnic group of mainly East African descent
 Semi-Inclusive Deep Inelastic Scattering, a process in high energy particle physics.

See also
Sidi (disambiguation)